The 2000 European Nations Cup (ENC) Fourth Division (a European rugby union competition for national teams) was contested over one year during which all teams (divided in three pools) met each other once. There was no promotion or relegation due the 2003 Rugby World Cup European qualification.

Pool 1

Table

Results

Pool 2

Table

Results

Pool 3

Table

Results

Bibliography

See also
 European Nations Cup First Division 2000
 European Nations Cup Second Division 2000
 European Nations Cup Third Division 2000

European Nations Cup (rugby union)
1999–2000 in European rugby union